Rozanne Damone "Rozie" Curtis is an American choreographer and voice actress. She is mostly known for doing voiceovers in English dubs for Japanese anime and works with ADV Films and Seraphim Digital. Currently, she is the manager of community outreach for Theatre Under the Stars and associate director for Crosswind Productions.

Filmography

Voice Roles 
AD Police - Kyoko Miyano
All Purpose Cultural Cat Girl Nuku Nuku - Maho
Clannad - Rie Nishima
Clannad After Story - Rie Nishima (episode 13-14), Yagi (eps 15-16, 22), Additional Voices
Compiler - Interpreter (as Rozanne Curtis)
Cyber Team in Akihabara - Kamome's Mom (eps 7, 16), Magazine Stand Lady (ep 9)
Demon King Daimao - Mitsuko Torii
Generator Gawl - Masami
Girls und Panzer - Anzu Kadotani
Horizon in the Middle of Nowhere - Musashi
Kill Me Baby - Agiri Goshiki
Le Chevalier d'Eon - Additional Voices
Legend of the Mystical Ninja - Rumie Himuro
Mystical Detective Loki Ragnarok - Hel (ep 14)
Needless - Kasumi Ogiha
Pani Poni Dash - Behomi
Saiyuki - Huang
Samurai Girls - Kanetsugu Naoe (as Vestal Vee)
Steel Angel Kurumi 2 - Uruka Sumeragi
Street Fighter II V - Party Guest, Receptionist (ADV dub)
Those Who Hunt Elves - Ritsuko Inoue

Live-Action Roles 
 Paradise, Texas - Records Clerk, Choreographer (staff role)

References

External links 
 
 Rozie Curtis at CrystalAcids Anime Voice Actor Database
 

Living people
American choreographers
American stage actresses
American voice actresses
People from the Las Vegas Valley
Year of birth missing (living people)
21st-century American women